The 2021–22 Duke Blue Devils men's basketball team represented Duke University during the 2021–22 NCAA Division I men's basketball season. The Blue Devils played their home games at Cameron Indoor Stadium in Durham, North Carolina, as a member of the Atlantic Coast Conference.

On June 2, 2021, the school announced that Coach Mike Krzyzewski would retire following the completion of the 2021–22 season after 42 years as head coach of Duke and 47 years of coaching. Associate head coach Jon Scheyer was named the head coach in waiting to become the team's new head coach after the conclusion of the season.

After losing to longtime rival North Carolina in their final home game, the team made it to the NCAA Tournament for the first time since 2019, as the 2020 tournament was cancelled and Duke did not make the 2021 tournament. Duke reached the Final Four for the 13th time under Krzyzewski, where they again lost to North Carolina 81–77 in their first-ever NCAA tournament meeting.

Previous season
In a season limited due to the ongoing COVID-19 pandemic, the Blue Devils finished the 2020–21 season 13–11, 9–9 to finish in 10th place in ACC play. Their season ended with their withdrawal from the ACC tournament due to positive COVID-19 tests within the program. As a result, the Blue Devils failed to receive a bid to the NCAA tournament for the first time since 1995 ending the second longest active streak of NCAA appearances.

Offseason

Coaching changes
After it became clear Scheyer would be taking over for Coach K in 2022, associate head coach Nate James left the school to become the new head coach at Austin Peay. Nolan Smith, previously the director of basketball operations, was promoted to an assistant coach, joining Jon Scheyer and Chris Carrawell.

Departures

Source

Incoming transfers

Source

2021 recruiting class

2022 Recruiting class

Roster

Schedule and results
Duke hosted a multiple-team event in which they played Army and Campbell.

|-
!colspan=9 style=| Exhibition

|-
!colspan=9 style=| Non-conference regular season

|-
!colspan=12 style=|ACC regular season

|-
!colspan=12 style=|ACC Tournament

|-
!colspan=12 style=|NCAA tournament

Rankings

*Coaches did not release a week 1 poll.

References

Duke
2021-22
Duke Blue Devils men's basketball
Duke Blue Devils men's basketball
Duke
NCAA Division I men's basketball tournament Final Four seasons